Günter Schießwald (born September 25, 1973) is an Austrian football player who currently plays for FK Blau Weiss Hollabrunn.

External links
Profile at Rapidarchiv.at

Austrian footballers
Austria international footballers
FK Austria Wien players
SK Rapid Wien players
Austrian Football Bundesliga players
1973 births
Living people

Association football defenders